Irvine–Gass syndrome, pseudophakic cystoid macular edema or postcataract CME is one of the most common causes of visual loss after cataract surgery. The syndrome is named in honor of S. Rodman Irvine and J. Donald M. Gass.

The incidence is more common in older types of cataract surgery, where postcataract CME could occur in 20–60% of patients, but with modern cataract surgery, incidence of Irvine–Gass syndrome has reduced significantly.

Replacement of the lens as treatment for cataract can cause pseudophakic macular edema (‘pseudophakia’ means ‘replacement lens’). This could occur as the surgery involved sometimes irritates the retina (and other parts of the eye) causing the capillaries in the retina to dilate and leak fluid into the retina. This is less common today with modern lens replacement techniques.

References

External links 

Syndromes affecting the eye